Cruel Country is the twelfth studio album by American indie rock band Wilco. It was released on May 27, 2022, by dBpm Records. It is a double album.

Background 
Cruel Country features twenty-one songs written by frontman Jeff Tweedy. The double album consists primarily of live takes recorded at The Loft, the band's recording studio in Chicago. The sessions included all six Wilco members together in The Loft for the first time since The Whole Love (2011). With minimal overdubbing, Tweedy compared their recording approach on Cruel Country to that which they last employed on Sky Blue Sky (2007).

Music and themes 
The album sees the band fully embracing their country music leanings. In a letter published upon the album's announcement, Jeff Tweedy wrote, "I think there's been an assumption over the years that Wilco is some sort of country band. There's a lot of evidence to support that way of thinking about our band because there have been elements of country music in everything we've ever done. But to be honest, we've never been particularly comfortable with accepting that definition of the music we make. With this album though, I'll tell you what, Wilco is digging in and calling it country." Tweedy explained that the genre provided an ideal space to explore United States history: "Because it is the country I love, and because it's country music that I love, I feel a responsibility to investigate their mirrored problematic natures. I believe it's important to challenge our affections for things that are flawed."

Release and promotion 
Tweedy first announced he was at work on a new Wilco album through his Substack newsletter in February 2022. The album was officially announced on April 28, 2022, with the single "Falling Apart (Right Now)" released the same day. The second single, "Tired of Taking It Out on You", was released on May 10, 2022. The album was released digitally on May 27, 2022, by dBpm Records, with physical releases on CD and LP planned for a later date due to the supply chain crisis. The release of Cruel Country coincided with Wilco's Solid Sound Festival at MASS MoCA, where the band performed the album in its entirety. A double LP and a two-disc CD were finally released by dBpm Records on January 20, 2023.

Critical reception 

Cruel Country was met with critical acclaim. At Metacritic, which assigns a normalized rating out of 100 to reviews from professional publications, the album received an average score of 83, based on 17 reviews. Aggregator AnyDecentMusic? gave it 7.9 out of 10, based on their assessment of the critical consensus.

Jon Pareles of The New York Times deemed it an "understated magnum opus", writing, "A song can only do so much, and on Cruel Country Wilco offers no grand lesson or master plan, only observations, feelings and enigmas. Many of the album's best moments are wordless ones."

Year-end lists

Track listing

Personnel 
Wilco
 Jeff Tweedy – vocals, guitar, production, album design
 John Stirratt – bass
 Glenn Kotche – drums
 Mikael Jorgensen – keyboards
 Nels Cline – guitars
 Pat Sansone – guitar, arrangement (tracks 3, 8)

Additional personnel
 Jennifer Kummer – french horn (tracks 3, 8)
 Wilco – production
 Tom Schick – production, engineering, mixing
 Teddy Morgan – engineering (tracks 3, 8)
 Mark Greenberg – engineering assistance, album design
 Bob Ludwig – mastering
 Lawrence Azerrad – album design
 Crystal Myers – album design

Charts

References 

2022 albums
DBpm Records albums
Wilco albums